The Mall in Columbia, also known as the Columbia Mall, is the central shopping mall for the planned community of Columbia, Maryland, United States. It has over 200 specialty stores and the anchor stores are AMC Theatres, Lidl, Main Event Entertainment, Barnes & Noble, JCPenney, Macy's, and Nordstrom. Restaurants include PF Chang's, Maggiano's Little Italy and The Cheesecake Factory. It is located in the Town Center area of the city and attracts shoppers from surrounding counties in Maryland.

History

Architect Frank Gehry designed The Rouse Company Columbia exhibit building, and was initially selected to design the neighboring mall centerpiece. Gehry was later rejected by Rouse for lack of experience, and the firm of Cope, Linder, & Walmsley was contracted for the project.

The Mall opened in 1971 with two major anchor stores: Hochschild Kohn's (which was replaced by Hecht's in the mid-1970s) and Woodward & Lothrop (a.k.a. Woodies, which closed in late 1995 and was replaced by JCPenney in July 1996), as well as a McCrory's and Lerner's, which were minor anchors. Howard Research and Development was probed shortly after opening for purchasing bulk energy contracts on electricity while charging market rates to tenants.

Of the original 102 stores, those still in operation at the mall as of January 2020 include: Edward Arthur Jeweler and GNC.

In 1997, the Hecht's store (now Macy's) added a third level. The Lord & Taylor wing opened in November 1998 (along with two new parking garages); the Nordstrom wing opened in September 1999. Also at this time, 20 to 30 stores opened in a new  wing near Hecht's. The interior was renovated by replacing the floors, lighting, skylights and air conditioning units by the end of 1998.

A Cheesecake Factory restaurant opened on The Mall property near the movie theaters in late 2005.  The Mall's Hecht's store became Macy's on September 9, 2006.

The Mall was sold to General Growth Properties by The Rouse Company in 2004.

A December 2007 decision by local General Growth Properties managers to abandon The Mall's traditional "Poinsettia Tree" Christmas display sparked a grassroots movement by several hundred Columbia residents for the return of the display which had come to be viewed as a local tradition. The story was picked up by The Washington Post, and the publicity led mall managers to reverse their decision and return the popular display in 2008. Part of what makes the "tree" unique is its watering system and plant specifications. In 2017, the large water fountain within which the "tree" had been installed each year, was replaced with at-grade flooring.

In early 2013, construction began on an addition to the outdoor "Plaza at The Mall in Columbia" to replace the L.L. Bean store (which closed in May 2013) with additional stores and restaurants. The first phase of the outdoor expansion opened in November 2013. On April 28, 2015, Howard County Police announced an increased presence at village centers and malls following protests and riots the day before that affected General Growth's Mondawmin Mall in Baltimore.

In May 2018, a  Main Event Entertainment facility opened on the south side of the mall, featuring 22 bowling lanes and over a hundred virtual reality video games.

The late 2010s saw multiple classic chain anchors retreat from brick and mortar after being disrupted by digital retailers in recent years.

In October, 2018, it was announced the Sears store would close and become German supermarket chain Lidl. 

In August 2020, it was announced high-end department store Lord & Taylor would close all of its locations after 195 years of business.

Key dates
1971: The Mall in Columbia opens in August.
1981: A new wing that includes a food court and Sears is added.
1998: Lord & Taylor opens along with two new parking garages.
1999: A new wing that includes 40 stores, a third parking garage, and Nordstrom is added.
2000: L.L. Bean opens outside of the mall. It is only the third retail location for the Maine-based outdoors catalog company.
2001: PF Chang's China Bistro, Z'Tejas (replaced by Uno Chicago Grill in 2004), and Champps Restaurant & Bar open in the Plaza at The Mall in Columbia.
2003: AMC Theatres opens a 14-screen movie theater next to Champps Restaurant.
2013: L.L. Bean closes and makes way for an expansion of the Mall's outdoor plaza.
2014:  outdoor expansion to the mall opens, deemed "The Plaza at The Mall in Columbia".
2017: The center court fountain is removed, and Sears downsizes to the first floor.
2018: Main Event Entertainment facility opens on the south side of the mall on the second floor of the Sears anchor space, and Sears closes.
2019: The food court fountain was drained and filled with plants, and a glass elevator was installed outside of Main Event Entertainment.
2020: Lord & Taylor closes.
2021: Lidl opens in the remaining Sears anchor space.

Current anchors
JCPenney (since 1996)
Nordstrom (since 1999)
AMC Theatres (since 2003)
Macy's (since 2006)
Main Event Entertainment (since 2018)
 Lidl (since 2021)

Former anchors
Woodward & Lothrop (1971–1995, now JCPenney)
Hochschild-Kohn (1971–1974), 
Hecht's (1975–2006, now Macy's)
Sears (1981–2018)
Lord & Taylor (1998–2020)

Incidents

2014 shooting
On January 25, 2014, at around 11:15 a.m., 19-year-old Darion Marcus Aguilar entered the Zumiez store on the second floor of the mall, armed with a Mossberg 500 12-gauge shotgun with a pistol grip, and fired six to nine shots, killing two employees—21-year-old Brianna Benlolo and 25-year-old Tyler Johnson—and shot another person before committing suicide. Four others were injured unrelated to the shooting. Police arrived within two minutes to find an extensive amount of ammunition and crude explosive devices next to Aguilar's body, which were disabled safely. All of the injured were treated and later discharged from the Howard County General Hospital.

2015 shooting
Former Jessup correctional officer Hong Young was arrested on March 2, 2015, on suspicion of shooting at the Columbia AMC theater building and gunfire incidents at the National Security Agency, Arundel Mills Costco, Inter-county Connector and Laurel Walmart.

References

External links
 

Brookfield Properties
Buildings and structures in Columbia, Maryland
Shopping malls in Maryland
Tourist attractions in Howard County, Maryland
Shopping malls established in 1971
1971 establishments in Maryland